Joachim Johannes Hermann Widlak (30 March 1930 – 21 October 2011) was a German conductor.

From 1953 to 1959, he worked as a conductor in Magdeburg.

Further reading 
 Widlak, Joachim. In Ingrid Bigler-Marschall (Ed.): Deutsches Theater-Lexikon. Weisbrod - Wiel. Walter de Gruyter, 2006, .
 Paul S. Ulrich: Biographisches Verzeichnis für Theater, Tanz und Musik. Vol. 2, Berlin 1997 p. 2025.
 Horst Seeger: Opernlexikon, 3rd enlarged edition, Wilhelmshaven, 1987, p. 684

References

External links 
 

German conductors (music)
Music directors
1930 births
2011 deaths
People from Wrocław